The British Transport Police Authority is the police authority that oversees the British Transport Police. A police authority is a governmental body in the United Kingdom that defines strategic plans for a police force and provides accountability so that the police function "efficiently and effectively", and the British Transport Police patrol the railways in England, Wales, and Scotland.

The chair, appointed by 
the Secretary of State for Transport, was Alistair Graham from its founding in 2004 until the end of 2011, Millie Banerjee from 2011 to 2015. Esther McVey served as chair from 2015 to 2017. Ron Barclay-Smith was appointed as chair in 2018.

References

External links 
 

Department for Transport
Non-departmental public bodies of the United Kingdom government
Police authorities of the United Kingdom